Daingean GAA is a Gaelic Athletic Association club located in Daingean, County Offaly, Ireland. The club is almost exclusively concerned with the game of Gaelic football and participates in competitions organized by the Offaly County Board.

Early years

The Phillipstown Mandevilles club was founded in June 1889 and named in honour of the recently deceased Fenian John Mandeville. The new club's first game was a friendly against Rathangan. Like most clubs in Offaly at this time, the bitter Parnellite split of 1890 ended the playing of games for the rest of the decade. The club was restarted in 1900, however, a rival club called Killeen Emmets was also established. Success eluded both clubs until 1908 when a united effort saw Phillipstown take the Offaly JFC title for the first time.

Honours

 Offaly Senior Football Championship: 1909, 1962, 1965
 Offaly Senior B Football Championship: 1987
 Offaly Intermediate Football Championship: 1954, 2002
 Offaly Junior A Football Championship: 1908, 1927, 1937, 1953, 2014, 2020
 Offaly Minor A Football Championship: 1936, 1937

Notable players

 Ambrose Hickey
 Kevin Kilmurray

References

Gaelic games clubs in County Offaly
Gaelic football clubs in County Offaly